Penicillium hordei is a species of the genus of Penicillium which produces corymbiferone and roquefortine C.

Further reading

References

hordei
Fungi described in 1969